Stoyan Stoyanov (born 20 March 1947) is a Bulgarian volleyball player. He competed in the men's tournament at the 1968 Summer Olympics.

References

1947 births
Living people
Bulgarian men's volleyball players
Olympic volleyball players of Bulgaria
Volleyball players at the 1968 Summer Olympics